Richard Muyej Mangeze Mans is a Congolese politician.

In February 2010, he joined the government and in March 2012 he was appointed Minister of Interior, Security, Decentralization and customary affairs of the Democratic Republic of the Congo. He left the government at the reshuffle of the 7 December 2014. In 2016 he became governor of the province of Lualaba. On January 10, 2023, Richard Muyej left his post as governor of Lualaba to cede his post.

References

Living people
Government ministers of the Democratic Republic of the Congo
Year of birth missing (living people)